Anthony Bennett or Tony Bennett may refer to:

Politicians
Anthony Bennett (MP), MP for Bodmin in 1593
Anthony Bennett (Veritas politician) (born 1947), British former political candidate and current campaigner

Athletes
Anthony Bennett (basketball) (born 1993), Canadian basketball player
Tony Bennett (American football) (born 1967), former American football player
Tony Bennett (basketball) (born 1969), American basketball coach and former player

Others
Anthony Bennett (artist) (born 1966), Australian artist
Tony Bennett (born 1926), American pop and jazz singer
Tony Bennett (sociologist) (born 1947), Australian academic and cultural theorist
Tony Bennett (superintendent), American official, former Indiana State Superintendent and former Florida Commissioner of Education
Tony L. Bennett (1940–2022), American politician and police officer